Frying is the cooking of food in oil or another fat. Similar to sautéing, pan-fried foods are generally turned over once or twice during cooking to make sure that the food is well-made, using tongs or a spatula, while sautéed foods are cooked by "tossing in the pan".  A large variety of foods may be fried.

History

Frying is believed to have first appeared in the Ancient Egyptian kitchen, during the Old Kingdom, around 2500 BCE. The first record of the frying technique in the western world had been traced from a painting in the 16th century which depicted an old lady frying an egg.

It is believed that frying was created, and used, as a way to preserve food. One of the earliest items to be fried were cakes known today as doughnuts.

Variations 
Unlike water, fats can reach temperatures much higher than 100°C (212°F) before boiling. This paired with their heat absorption properties, neutral or desired taste, and non-toxicity, makes them uniquely valuable in cooking, especially frying. As a result, they are used in a wide variety of cuisines. A further advantage comes from fat's potential reusability; a pot of water used to heat potatoes will be full of starch and potentially bacteria, whereas a pot of oil used for the same purpose could be filtered, cooled, and safely used another day.

Through frying, one can sear or even carbonize the surface of foods while caramelizing sugars. The food is cooked much more quickly and has a characteristic crispness and texture. Depending on the food, the fat will penetrate it to varying degrees, contributing richness, lubricity, its own flavour, and calories.

Frying techniques vary in the amount of fat required, the cooking time, the type of cooking vessel required, and the manipulation of the food. Sautéing, stir-frying, pan frying, shallow frying, and deep frying are all standard frying techniques.

Pan-frying, sautéing, and stir-frying involve cooking foods in a thin layer of fat on a hot surface, such as a frying pan, griddle, wok, or sautee. Stir frying involves frying quickly at very high temperatures, requiring that the food be stirred continuously to prevent it from adhering to the cooking surface and burning.

Shallow frying is a type of pan frying using only enough fat to immerse approximately one-third to one-half of each piece of food; fat used in this technique is typically only used once. Deep-frying, on the other hand, involves totally immersing the food in hot oil, which is normally topped up and used several times before being disposed of. Deep-frying is typically a much more involved process and may require specialized oils for optimal results.

Deep frying is now the basis of a very large and expanding worldwide industry. Fried products have consumer appeal in all age groups and in virtually all cultures, and the process is quick, can easily be made continuous for mass production, and the food emerges sterile and dry, with a relatively long shelf life. The end products can then be easily packaged for storage and distribution. Some include potato chips, French fries, nuts, doughnuts, and instant noodles.

See also 

 Cooking oil
 Sautéing
 Stir frying
 Pan frying
 Gentle frying
 Shallow frying
 Deep frying
 Air fryer
 Vacuum fryer
 List of fried dough foods

Notes

References

External links

Best Easy Ways to Use Air Fryer for 
How Does an Air Fryer Work 

Cooking techniques
Food preparation techniques
Culinary terminology
Fried foods